Somabhai Gandalal Koli Patel (born 10 August 1940) is an Indian politician and a member of the 15th Lok Sabha of India. He represents the Surendranagar constituency of Gujarat and is a member of the Bharatiya Janata Party. Patel was arrested during the Emergency in 1977–78.

Somabhai Patel got the MLA ticket for the first time from the Bharatiya Janata Party in 1985, at that time Patel was a big character. Patel had turned the Koli caste, which was considered the backbone of the Congress, towards the Bharatiya Janata Party, as well as other OBC castes towards the Bharatiya Janata Party, due to which the Congress's Kham theory was in vain.

Positions held 
List of some positions
 1980–89 President, BJP, Taluka Viramgam, Gujarat
 1984–89 Vice Chairman, Municipality, Viramgam, Gujarat Member, Gujarat
 1989 Elected to 9th Lok Sabha
 1990 Member, Advisory Committee of the Ministry of Surface Transport
 1991 Re-elected to 10th Lok Sabha (2nd term)
 Elected to 14th Lok Sabha in 2004 (3rd term), Member of Committee on Foreign Affairs, Members of Committee on Absence of Members from the House Meeting
 Member, Committee on Absence of Members from the House Meeting since August 7, 2006

Other 
 1997–99 President of State Transport, Gujarat
 1985–90 Member, Joint Secretary of International Koli Samaj and Lions Club, Viramgam, Gujarat as well as Vice President of Gujarat State Koli Samaj

References

External links
 Official biographical sketch in Parliament of India website

People from Gujarat
Indian National Congress politicians
Living people
India MPs 2004–2009
1940 births
Lok Sabha members from Gujarat
India MPs 1989–1991
India MPs 1991–1996
India MPs 2009–2014
Koli people